The two-stage 2011 MLS Re-Entry Draft took place on December 5, 2011 (Stage 1) and December 12, 2011 (Stage 2). All 19 Major League Soccer clubs participated.

The Stage 1 and Stage 2 Drafts were conducted in the same order as the traditional Waiver Draft, with clubs choosing in reverse order of their 2011 Major League Soccer season finish. Expansion side Montreal Impact selected 19th.

Teams were able to select players who fell under the following circumstances:

 Players who were at least 23 years old, had a minimum of three years of MLS experience, and whose options were not exercised by their clubs (available at option salary for 2012).
 Players who were at least 25 years old, had a minimum of four years of MLS experience, were out of contract, and whose club did not offer them a contract at their previous salary (available at 2011 salary).
 Players who were at least 30 years old, had a minimum of eight years of MLS experience, were out of contract, and whose club did not wish to re-sign them (available for at least 105 percent of their 2011 salary).

Players who were not selected in the Stage 1 draft were made available for the Stage 2 draft. Clubs that selected players in Stage 2 must negotiate a new salary with any player not under contract.

Teams also had the option of passing on their selection.

Available players
Players were required to meet age and service requirements to participate as stipulated by the terms of the MLS Collective Bargaining Agreement. The list below includes all players identified by the league on November 30, 2011 as eligible for the Re-Entry Draft. On December 2, 2011 the league released an updated list, removing players who were traded, re-signed, or retired. A handful of players who were not traded, re-signed, or retired were also removed from the list. These players are listed below as "Withdrew prior to draft", which was an option available to eligible players.

Stage One
The first stage of the 2011 MLS Re-Entry Draft took place on December 5, 2011. All 19 Major League Soccer clubs participated.

Round 1

Round 2

Stage Two
The second stage of the 2011 MLS Re-Entry Draft took place on December 12, 2011. All 19 Major League Soccer clubs participated.

Round 1

Round 1 trades

Round 2

Round 3

Round 4

Round 5

After all clubs had passed on the remaining players, clubs were then allowed to draft their own former players. Los Angeles Galaxy selected defenders Frankie Hejduk and Dasan Robinson. No other club selected any of their own eligible players.

References

Categories 

Major League Soccer drafts
Mls Re-entry Draft, 2011
MLS Re-Entry Draft